Trauma bonds (also referred to as traumatic bonds) is a term developed by Patrick Carnes to describe emotional bonds with an individual (and sometimes, with a group) that arise from a recurring, cyclical pattern of abuse perpetuated by intermittent reinforcement through rewards and punishments. The process of forming trauma bonds is referred to as trauma bonding or traumatic bonding. A trauma bond usually involves a victim and a perpetrator in a uni-directional relationship wherein the victim forms an emotional bond with the perpetrator. This can also be conceptualized as a dominated-dominator or an abused-abuser dynamic. Two main factors are involved in the establishment of a trauma bond: a power imbalance and intermittent reinforcement of good and bad treatment, or reward and punishment. Trauma bonding can occur in the realms of romantic relationships, platonic friendships, parent-child relationships, incestuous relationships, cults, hostage situations, manager vs their direct reports, sex trafficking (especially that of minors), or tours of duty among military personnel.

Trauma bonds are based on terror, domination, and unpredictability. As a trauma bond between an abuser and a victim strengthens and deepens, it leads to conflicting feelings of alarm, numbness, and grief, which show up in a cyclical pattern. More often than not, victims in trauma bonds do not have agency and autonomy, and don't have an individual sense of self either. Their self-image is a derivative and an internalization of the abuser's conceptualization of them.

Trauma bonds have severe detrimental effects on the victim not only while the relationship persists, but beyond that as well. Some long-term impacts of trauma bonding include remaining in abusive relationships, having adverse mental health outcomes like low self-esteem, negative self image, and increased likelihood of depression and bipolar disorder, and perpetuating a generational cycle of abuse. Victims who traumatically bond with their victimizers are often unable to leave these relationships or are only able to do so with significant duress and difficulty. Even among those who do manage to leave, many go back to the abusive relationship due to the pervasiveness of the learned trauma bond.

Context 
In the 1980s, Donald G. Dutton and Susan L. Painter began to explore the concept of traumatic bonding theory in the context of abusive relationships and battered women. This work was then further studied in contexts of parent-child relationships, sexual exploitation, and more. Patrick Carnes developed the term to describe "the misuse of fear, excitement, sexual feelings, and sexual physiology to entangle another person." A simpler and more encompassing definition is that traumatic bonding is: "a strong emotional attachment between an abused person and his or her abuser, formed as a result of the cycle of violence." Carnes also did a lot of work on traumatic bonding theory, exploring it specifically in the context of betrayal, which involved the exploitation of the victim's trust, sense of power, or both, by the abuser.

Establishment 
Trauma bonds are formed in abused-abuser or victim-victimizer dynamics. A victim can form a trauma bond with an abuser in the presence of a perceived threat from the abuser, the conviction that the abuser will follow through with the threat, perception of some form of kindness from the abuser, isolation from perspectives that do not serve to deepen the trauma bond, and perceived lack of ability or capacity to leave the situation.

The first incident of abuse is often perceived as an anomaly, as a one-off instance occurring at the beginning of a seemingly healthy and positive relationship. The first incident is often not very severe and the expression of affection and care by the abuser following the incident pacifies the victim and instills in them the belief that the abuse is not recurring. However, later on, repeated instances of abuse and maltreatment generate a cognitive shift in the victim's mind: that preventing the abuse is in their power. By the time the inescapability of the abuse becomes apparent, the emotional trauma bond is already strong.

There are two main factors that facilitate the formation and continuation of a trauma bond: a power imbalance and intermittent reinforcement.

Power imbalance 
For a trauma bond to persist, it is necessary for a power differential to exist between the abuser and the victim such that the abuser is in a position of power and authority whereas the victim is not. Inequity in power can itself produce pathologies in individuals that can fortify the trauma bond. Upon experiencing intermittent punishment from the abuser/dominator, who is in a position of high power, the victim may internalize the abuser's perception of themselves. This may result in a tendency for the victim to self-blame in situations of violence perpetrated by the abuser, which can negatively impact the victim's self-concept.

A negative self-appraisal can maximize emotional dependency on the abuser and the cyclical nature of this dependency and negative self-concept can eventually lead to the formation of a strong emotional bond from the victim to the abuser (i.e. towards the person who is in a position of power and authority, from the person who is not).  Furthermore, physical, emotional, and sexual abuse can be used to maintain the power differential. This dynamic is also maintained via the interaction of the abuser's sense of power and the victim's sense of powerlessness and subjugation.

Intermittent reinforcement 
Intermittent reinforcement of rewards and punishments is crucial to the establishment and maintenance of a trauma bond. In trauma bonding, the abuser intermittently maltreats the victim in the forms of physical, verbal, emotional, and/or psychological abuse. This maltreatment is interspersed with positive behaviors like expressing affection and care, showing kindness, giving the victim gifts, and promising not to repeat the abuse. Alternating and sporadic periods of good and bad treatment serve to intermittently reinforce the victim.

The pervasiveness of learning something through intermittent reinforcement can be elucidated upon by drawing from learning theory and the behaviorist perspective. In the presence of an aversive stimulus, reinforcement through rewards in unpredictable ways are a key component to learning. When the learner is unable to predict when they will get the reward, learning is maximized. Similarly, the intermittent expressions of affection and care are unexpected and the inability to predict them makes them more sought after. Intermittent reinforcement produces behavioral patterns that are tough to terminate. Thus, they develop incredibly strong emotional bonds.

Maintenance 
A trauma bond can be maintained by keeping the power imbalance and the intermittency of abuse intact.

Trauma bonds can also be maintained if the victim is financially dependent on the abuser or has some investment in the relationship, such as a child with the abuser.

Cognitive dissonance theory can also explain the maintenance of a trauma bond. This theory postulates that when individuals experience a conflict between their beliefs and action, they are motivated to make efforts to reduce or eliminate the incongruency in an attempt to minimize the psychological discomfort arising from it. In this vein, victims may distort their cognitions about the trauma and violence of the relationship in order to maintain a positive view of the relationship. This could involve rationalizing the abuser's behavior, justifications, minimizing of the impact of the abuser's violence, and self-blaming.

Furthermore, research shows that the memory of instances wherein abuse was experienced is dissociated or state-dependent, meaning that the memories of abuse only fully resurface when the situation is similar in intensity and experience to the original situation of terror.

If and when the victim finally decides to leave the abusive relationship, the immediate relief from the traumatizing violence will begin to abate and the underlying, deep attachment formed as a result of intermittent reinforcement, will begin to surface. This current period of vulnerability and emotional exhaustion is likely to trigger memories of when the abuser was temporarily affectionate and caring. In the desire to receive that affection once more, the victim may try to return to the abusive relationship.

Strong social support, however, can be a protective factor when it comes to preserving the victim's functioning and providing a buffer in traumatic situations.

The role of attachment 
John Bowlby maintained that a secure attachment was an evolutionarily sound human need that superseded even the need for food and reproduction. Attachment has been explored in depth in caregiver-child dynamics but recent research has shown that the principles that explain attachment between caregivers and infants can also explain attachment throughout one's lifespan, specifically in the context of intimate relationships and romantic bonds.

Attachment bonds formed during early life lay the foundation for interpersonal relationships, interactions, personality characteristics, and mental health in the future. Infants usually form attachments with their parents or immediate caregivers. Harlow's research on monkeys shows that infant monkeys formulate attachment bonds even with abusive mothers (In the experimental setup, the abusive 'mother' was a monkey made out of fabric who delivered mild shocks to the infant monkey or flung the infant monkey across the arena). These findings also apply to human attachment bonds. Even in situations where immediate caregivers are abusive, human infants still tend to attach to them – rejection from a caregiver only enhances the efforts to increase proximity to them and establish an attachment bond with them.

Furthermore, in situations of danger, humans seek increased attachment. When ordinary pathways of attachment are unavailable, people tend to turn to their abusers. This leads to the development of strong bonds and deep emotional connections with abusers. This attachment – both to abusive caregivers and to other abusers in the absence of a main caregiver – may be adaptive in the short-run as it may aid survival. But in the long-run, this attachment is maladaptive and can lay the foundation for, increase vulnerability to, and even directly lead to trauma bonding.

Stockholm syndrome 
The concept of trauma bonding is often conflated with Stockholm syndrome. Although there are overarching similarities between the two, especially in the context of developing an emotional bond with one's victimizer, trauma bonding and Stockholm syndrome are distinct from one another. The main difference is the directionality of the relationship. While a trauma bond is uni-directional in that only the victim becomes emotionally attached to the victimizer, Stockholm syndrome is bi-directional. In other words, in the case of Stockholm syndrome, the emotional connection is reciprocal such that the abuser also seems to develop an emotional connection towards the abused and harbor positive feelings for the abused, in addition to the abused developing an emotional bond with the abuser.

Realms of existence

In abusive relationships
Unhealthy, or traumatic, bonding occurs between people in an abusive relationship. The bond is stronger for people who have grown up in abusive households because it seems to them to be a normal part of relationships.On the psychometric scale for Stockholm syndrome the three main parts are  justifying an abuser through cognitive distortions; Damage, ongoing psychological effects of abuse; and Love.  

Initially, the abuser is inconsistent in approach, developing it into an intensity perhaps not matched in other relationships of the victim. It is claimed the longer a relationship continues, the more difficult it is for people to leave the abusers with whom they have bonded.

There are multiple reasons as to why a victim would try to preserve their abusive relationship. A few of these many reasons could be fear, children, and financial constraints. These, among others could lead a victim to falsely accusing innocent people. This could be detrimental to both individuals involved.

Battered women 
Initial research about battered women held the view that a victim's return to an abusive relationship was an indicator of a flawed personality and more specifically, masochism. However, this view was perpetuated by the 'just-world hypothesis', that supports the idea that people “get what's coming for them”. In other words, the tendency to victim-blame arises from the belief that the world is a just and fair place where the victim is seen as deserving of any negative consequences. However, research on battered women and research on traumatic bonding has shown that that is not the case. In terms of battered women's decision to stay in or return to an abusive relationship, many factors are at play, ranging from family history and role expectations, to access to resources, to the dynamics of the relationship itself. A crucial part of the relationship's dynamic is the existence of a trauma bond. Maltreatment interspersed with periods of kindness aid the formation of a trauma bond that makes the victim harbor positive feelings towards the abuser.

Among battered women, a three-phase process can explain the intermittent reward-punishment cycle. During phase one, there is a gradual increase in tension, followed by an "explosive battering incident" in phase two, which is then followed by a peaceful expression of love and affection from the abuser during phase three. The recurring and cyclical nature of these phases gives rise to a trauma bond.

Sex trafficking 
Trauma bonds are extremely common in situations of sex-trafficking, child grooming, commercial sexual exploitation of children (CSEC), and pimp-prostitute relationships.

Grooming 
Child grooming involves the establishment and maintenance of trauma bonds between the child and the abuser. Along with the factors of power imbalance and intermittent reinforcement that contribute to trauma bonding, child grooming also necessitates gaining the trust of those around the child. Grooming also involves the dynamic of gaining the child's trust while simultaneously violating their boundaries. Treats and trips are used as bribes to both gain access to the child as well as ensure that they comply. Intense attachments coupled with cognitive distortions deepen the bond.

A 2019 case study explores the life of one individual who was groomed. The victim's perception of the abuser as a benefactor, of the abuser as a substitute parent, and of the abuser as a mind-controller, all contributed to the development of a traumatic bond between the victim and the abuser. In terms of being a benefactor, the abuser in this case study went above and beyond to give the victim what they needed: from getting the victim a job to gifting them a plot of land for their first house, the abuser was always present as a benefactor. The abuser also acted as a substitute parent, giving advice and offering emotional support in times of crises. The roles of the abuser as a benefactor and substitute parent constituted the good treatment necessary to establish a trauma bond. In contrast, the abuser's role as a mind-controller involved controlling and dominating tendencies that emulated being brainwashed. This combination of perceptions established a traumatic bond that the victim found incredible difficulty in leaving, because rejecting the emotional connection as a whole would also involve rejecting the perks and benefits – the trips, the gifts, the treats, the confidante and the caretaker.

Child grooming can be understood from a developmental perspective as well and the relationship between the victim and the abuser evolves across the lifespan. Grooming starts when the child is extremely young – the trust of the child and the family is acquired. The child is given immense attention and is showered with gifts. As the individual matures and enters adolescence, the abuser becomes a confidante and a benefactor. In the aforementioned case study, the abuser gave the victim career advice and even picked him up and dropped him off to school. Then, at the onset of adulthood, the abuser provided the victim with land to build their home and became the person the victim brought their partner home to. Overall, as the victim's developmental needs evolved, so did the abuser's response, such that the only thing constant was the victim's need for affection. In other words, the abuser was "able to capitalize on [the victim's] relational needs" until the victim was able to meet those needs in other ways.

Commercial sexual exploitation of children (CSEC) 
The commercial sexual exploitation of children (CSEC) can cause debilitating physical and psychological trauma. Along with causing functional impairments, it can amplify risk-taking behaviors and increase impulse dysregulation that can further compromise the child's ability to conceptualize, comprehend, establish, and maintain boundaries. This can lead to confusion regarding what safety, affection, intimacy, and kindness entail, resulting in the formation of a trauma bond with the abuser/trafficker that is based on skewed perceptions of safety and kindness. The trauma bond deepens and strengthens when isolation and threats to survival increase, forcing the victim to depend almost entirely on the abuser for survival and protection. This increased emotional dependence on the abuser normalizes the emotional violence experienced by the victim at the hands of the abuser and gradually, the victim develops a sense of trust and safety – albeit skewed – towards the abuser.

Trauma coercive bond 
Trauma bonding thrives in the presence of a power imbalance and intermittent reward/punishment behavior. Trauma coercive bonding, on the other hand, has two additional elements: social isolation and perceived inability to escape the situation. Since these two elements are crucial to the experiences of victims of CSEC, their bonds with their abusers are better described as trauma coercive bonds rather than simply as trauma bonds. The element of coercion concretized by social isolation and the perceived inability to escape makes the trauma bond more complex and far more deep-rooted. The use of coercive trauma bonding encapsulates the psychosocial dynamics of a relationship between a victim and a perpetrator of CSEC.

Intimate partner violence (IPV) 
IPV has been defined as the physical, sexual, psychological, economical or stalking abuse, both concrete and menaced, perpetuated by current or ex-partners. Trauma bonding is used to solidify this type of relationship by, rationalizing and/or minimizing a violent partner’s behavior, self-blame, and reporting love in the context of fear.

Parent-child relationships 
Trauma bonds in parent-child or caregiver-child dynamics can be borne either from abuse and neglect or from incestuous relationships.

Abuse and/or neglect 
The children of dismissive caregivers or cruel/harsh caregivers can develop insecure attachments, which can be very dysfunctional. Inconsistencies in reward and punishment (i.e. intermittent reinforcement of good and bad treatment) can highlight the affection the child receives from the parent, forcing a split between the abuse and the kindness such that the child seeks to form an overall positive view of the caregiver and thus, focuses only on the affection and kindness they receive. Overall, a trauma bond develops such that the child's sense of self is derived from their emotional dependence on the authority figure who, in this case, is the parent and/or caregiver.

Incest 
Incestuous relationships between parents and children cultivate trauma bonds similar to those prevalent in victims of sex-trafficking. All participants of a 1994 study on trauma in adult incest survivors demonstrated some type of trauma bond with their abusers. There was a positive correlation between the pervasiveness of the trauma bond and the amount of contact the victim or the victim's close family members had with the abuser: those who self-reported less pervasive trauma also reported sustained contact with their abuser, while those who self-reported more pervasive trauma demonstrated an active avoidance of maintaining a relationship with their abuser. In incestuous parent-child dynamics, the study found that maintaining an unhealthy relationship with the abuser contributes to trauma and sustains the trauma bond. This aligns with the idea that trauma bonds are toxic and difficult to leave due to the inherent power imbalance, which, in parent-child relationships, is even more pervasive than in other situations. Incestuous relationships also have an added layer of betrayal trauma, which arises from the exploitation of the victim's trust, resulting in a feeling of betrayal.

Military (tours of duty) 
Trauma bonds can develop in military settings. The literature demonstrates this specifically in the context of tours of duty, wherein military personnel are deployed in hostile environments or areas of combat. A 2019 study exploring this specific phenomenon sought to understand the traumatic bond developed between Japanese soldiers and Korean 'comfort women' in the midst of World War II. The trauma in this case was two-fold: not only did the trauma bond develop in an abused-abuser dynamic, the trauma itself was a result of and was perpetuated by the war. While the relationships provided the Japanese soldiers with emotional relief and an escape from the violence of the war and the tyranny of the higher-ranking officers, they provided the Korean 'comfort women' much-desired protection and kindness from the soldiers.

Soldiers would behave aggressively and violently towards the 'comfort women' and often sexually exploit them. They would use intimidation tactics to assert dominance and foster coercion. However, this abuse would be interspersed with kindness and empathy from the soldiers, whose moods – and subsequent behavior and interactions – were highly contingent on the time and context in terms of the ongoing war. Nonetheless, the intermittent kindness allowed the formation and maintenance of a trauma bond. Intermittent rewards were sometimes also more tangible, in the form of food, outings, and physical protection. However, protection and emotional support were pivotal in maintaining the trauma bonds, and far more important than food and outings. The Korean 'comfort women' eventually came to be emotionally dependent on the Japanese soldiers and began to relate this dependence with their own sense of power, thereby establishing a trauma bond that, for some, persisted even after the war was over.

Outcomes 
Trauma bonding has several short-term and long-term impacts on the abused. It can force people to stay in abusive relationships, negatively affect self-image and self-esteem, perpetuate transgenerational cycles of abuse, and result in adverse mental health outcomes like increased likelihood of developing depression and/or bipolar disorder.

Staying in abusive relationships 
Owing to the debilitating psychological manipulation involved in the development of a trauma bond, abused people tend to stay in abusive relationships mainly because the perceived consequences of leaving the relationship seem far more negative than the consequences of staying in the abusive relationship.

In such relationships, maltreatment is often interspersed with fragments of solace and peace that involve the expression of love, kindness, affection, and/or general friendliness from the abuser towards the abused. This intermittent reinforcement of a reward (here, the abuser's love and kindness)  amidst all the abuse becomes what the victim begins to hold on to. Thus, victims tend to become emotionally dependent on the abuser and construct the belief that their survival is contingent upon receiving the abuser's love. Victims thereby begin to formulate their sense of identity and their sense of self around receiving the abuser's affection. Additionally, the provision of intermittent love and affection makes the victim cling onto the hope that things can change. Furthermore, self-blame, the fear of social stigma and embarrassment, the fear of loneliness in the absence of a partner, and the lack of or poor social support from other family and friends also contribute to individuals remaining in abusive relationships.

Perpetuation of transgenerational cycles of abuse 
People who have experienced trauma and traumatic bonds can – knowingly or unknowingly – repeat the cycle of abuse. In other words, victims who were traumatically bonded with abusers may grow to become abusers themselves. The abuse that victims inflict may or may not involve trauma bonding.

For instance, in a 2018 study on convicted child murderers, researchers found that caregivers who committed child homicide (murdered their child/care-receiver) had experienced traumatic experiences and had trauma bonds with abusers in their early lives. Individuals with cruel and/or dismissive caregivers are likely to develop insecure attachments that result in a host of problems, including emotion dysregulation and an attitude of confusion towards the caregiver, who becomes a source of comfort as well as fear. These adverse attachments can manifest in the individual's relationship with their own children as well. Attachment issues and painful memories of trauma bonds with their own caregivers can be triggered and individuals may demonstrate heightened and disproportionate aggression toward their child, some culminating in homicide. In this study, participants had experienced physical abuse, sexual abuse, lack of protection from external dangers, abandonment, emotional rejection, and more from their caregivers. Nonetheless, participants expressed unconditional love towards their caregiver, justified by wanting to maintain an overall positive view of them. In their continued efforts to form an emotional connection, a trauma bond was fostered. These experiences had a severe negative impact on their relationship and bonding with their own children, contributing to "affectionless, un-empathetic interpersonal behavior" that inflated aggressive and violent tendencies triggered by vulnerabilities.

Neurophysiological outcomes 
The experience of being in a trauma bond can have adverse neurobiological and neurophysiological outcomes. The body of the victim of a trauma bond is in a perpetual 'fight-or-flight' response state, which can increase cortisol levels that can have a cascading effect and trigger other hormones. Persistent, chronic stress can also hamper the cellular response in the body, thereby negatively impacting immunity, organ health, mood, energy levels, and more. In the long run, this can cause epigenetic changes as well. Furthermore, a study conducted in 2015 found that the establishment of a trauma bond in infancy is also linked with amygdala dysfunction, neurobehavioral deficits, and increased vulnerability to psychiatric disorders later on in life.``Psychological abuse is correlated to sleep related impairments.  Disruption in sleep patterns lead to adverse neurophysiological problems; such as an increase in anxiety, irritability.  For victims of psychological abuse the increase in cortisol affects the brain in such a manner that it allows the trauma bonding to be strengthened.

Adverse mental health outcomes 
Trauma bonding is linked to several adverse mental health and wellbeing outcomes. As a result of the abuse itself and of their emotional dependence on their abusers, victims tend to develop a self-image that is incredibly negative. "[C]ontrolling, restricting, degrading, isolating, or dominating" abuse has a crippling effect on the self-image and self-esteem of the abused and this psychological abuse is far more dangerous than the physical abuse. In a 2010 study on battered women labeling themselves as "stupid", researchers found that victims who felt like they allowed themselves to be mistreated and victims who stayed in abusive relationships labelled themselves as "stupid" for doing so. This further contributes to a negative self-image and maintenance of low self-esteem, both of which foster a poor self-concept, which, in turn, adversely impacts mental wellbeing. The same was observed in the aforementioned case study on grooming.

Trauma bonding can also lead to dissociative symptoms that could be a self-preservation and/or coping mechanism. Neurobiological changes can also affect brain development and hamper learning. The internalization of the psychological manipulation and trauma can give rise to anxiety and increase the likelihood of engagement in risk-taking behaviors. Furthermore, the isolation involved in trauma bonding can foster a generally skewed sense of trust, making victims vulnerable to situations that may retraumatize or revictimize them. Victims may also tend to either completely dismiss or minimize dangerous, damaging behaviors and violence around them.

Trauma bonds in parent-child relationships (wherein the child is the victim and the parent is the abuser) can also lead to depressive symptoms later on in life. In a 2017 study exploring this, it was found that an "affectionless control" parenting style, characterized by high protection and low care from parents, was a major predictor of depressive symptomology for the victim. In other words, the presence of poor parental bonding coupled with childhood trauma bonds increased the likelihood of the child developing depressive symptoms in the future. A negative self-image is formed when feelings of inadequacy and hopelessness persist and are reinforced by caregivers. Perpetual efforts to seek secure emotional attachments reap no rewards and a trauma bond facilitates a negative core schema that influences perceptions and interactions throughout one's life. This can give rise to mental health issues such as depression, bipolar disorder, mania, suicidality, and substance abuse that can be pervasive and lifelong.

See also 
 Attachment theory
 Betrayal trauma
 Child sexual abuse
 Domestic violence
 Human bonding
 Psychological trauma

References 

Social psychology
Domestic violence
Sex trafficking
Trauma types